Allanda Smith (born March 7, 1962) is a former American football player. Smith attended Texas Christian University. He was a defensive back on the school's football team. Smith was drafted by the Washington Federals in the 1984 United States Football League draft. His rights were traded to the LA Express. Smith signed with the Express  and played the 1984 and 1985 USFL seasons with LA. Smith was drafted by the NFL's Minnesota Vikings in the 1984 NFL Supplemental Draft of USFL and CFL players. Smith signed with the Vikings in time for the 1985 NFL season. He was on the injury reserve list for the whole 1985 season and was released by the Vikings during the off season between 1985 and 1986. He signed with the Washington Redskins in 1986. , but was released before the season started.

External links
Allanda Smith USFL stats with LA Express

Living people
TCU Horned Frogs football players
Los Angeles Express players
Place of birth missing (living people)
1962 births